The Nimer-1 ( Tiger), a wheeled armoured personnel carrier, is the first indigenous fighting vehicle made by Oman and is built by Engine Engineering Company LLC. An order for 6 armoured 4×4 vehicle has been tendered by the Royal Bahraini Army. The company is marketing these vehicles to police forces, foreign armies for border patrol or for riot control.

The exterior views suggest it employs a V-hull design.

Variants
Nimer-2 is a full armoured and slightly smaller variant of the Nimer-1.  It uses Level B6 armour plating.

Operators
 
Royal Bahraini Army - Nimer-2 version

Similar vehicles
 BPM-97 
 AMZ Dzik 
 Bushmaster Protected Mobility Vehicle 
 Cheetah MMPV 
 Otokar Kaya 
 Otokar Cobra 
 Dozor-B 
 Fennek /
 Komatsu LAV 
 BMC - Kirpi 
 Mahindra Marksman 
 Oshkosh M-ATV 
 MillenWorks Light Utility Vehicle 
 Petit Véhicule Protégé 
 Reva APC 
 RG-31 Nyala 
 RG-32 Scout 
 Shorland S600 /
 Saxon (vehicle) 
 T-98 Kombat 
 GAZ-2975 
 Véhicule Blindé Léger 
 Wolf Armoured Vehicle

References
 Nimer-1
 Nimer-2

Armoured fighting vehicles of the post–Cold War period
Wheeled armoured personnel carriers